Ulrich Brugger (born 1 April 1947) is a retired West German long-distance runner who specialized in the 5000 metres.

Biography
He won the bronze medal in the 3000 metres at the 1972 European Indoor Championships.

In domestic competitions, he represented the sports club Stuttgarter Kickers. He won the silver medal at the 1970 West German championships and another silver medal at the 1972 West German indoor championships.

References

1947 births
Living people
West German male long-distance runners